Archimediella is a genus of sea snails, marine gastropod mollusks in the family Turritellidae.

Species
Species within the genus Archimediella include:
 † Archimediella bonei (Baily, 1855) 
 † Archimediella cochlias (Bayan, 1873)
Species brought into synonymy
 Archimediella annulata (Kiener, 1843): synonym of Turritella annulata Kiener, 1843
 Archimediella bicingulata (Lamarck, 1822): synonym of Turritella bicingulata Lamarck, 1822
 Archimediella cochlea (Reeve, 1849): synonym of Turritella cochlea Reeve, 1849 (Alternate representation)
 Archimediella conspersa (A. Adams & Reeve in Reeve, 1849): synonym of Turritella conspersa A. Adams & Reeve in Reeve, 1849 (Alternate representation)
 Archimediella dirkhartogensis Garrard, 1972: synonym of Turritella dirkhartogensis (Garrard, 1972) (Original combination)
 Archimediella fastigiata (A. Adams & Reeve in Reeve, 1849): synonym of Turritella fastigiata A. Adams & Reeve in Reeve, 1849 (Alternate representation)
 Archimediella gemmata (Reeve, 1849): synonym of Turritella gemmata Reeve, 1849 (Alternate representation)
 Archimediella maculata (Reeve, 1849): synonym of Turritella maculata Reeve, 1849
 Archimediella occidua (Cotton & N. H. Woods, 1935): synonym of Turritella terebra (Linnaeus, 1758) (Alternate representationb of synonym)
 Archimediella torulosa (Kiener, 1843): synonym of Turritella torulosa Kiener, 1843
 Archimediella vermicularis (Brocchi, 1814): synonym of Helminthia vermicularis (Brocchi, 1814)

References

External links
 Sacco, F. (1895) I molluschi dei terreni terziarii del Piemonte e della Liguria. Parte XIX. (Turritellidae e Mathildidae). Carlo Clausen, Torino, 43 pp., 3 pl
 Harzhauser M. & Landau B. (2019). Turritellidae (Gastropoda) of the Miocene Paratethys Sea with considerations about turritellid genera. Zootaxa. 4681(1): 1-136

Turritellidae